A bar joke is a type of joke cycle. The basic syntax is as follows: "A <noun> walks into a bar and <humorous event happens>".

First recorded example 
The earliest known example of a bar joke is Sumerian, appearing in the form of two slightly different versions of a proverb inscribed alongside many others on two clay tablets excavated at Nippur at the end of the 19th century. The tablets were etched around 1700 BCE, during the Old Babylonian Empire, although Edmund I. Gordon, who published the first translation of most of the proverbs inscribed on these tablets, argued that the proverbs themselves probably date from a considerably earlier period.

Scholars differ on how best to translate the proverb from Sumerian. According to Gordon's translation, the proverb reads: "A dog, having entered an inn, did not see anything, (and so he said): 'Shall I open this (door)?'" The Assyriologist Seraina Nett provides a slightly different translation, suggesting that the proverb be read as “A dog entered into a tavern and said, ‘I cannot see anything. I shall open this', or ‘this one’”.

The meaning behind the proverb is also subject to debate among scholars. Gordon suggested that the inn also apparently served as a brothel (he notes that the word used in the proverb for inn or tavern, "éš-dam", can also be translated as "brothel", and it was common in ancient Mesopotamia for sex work to take place in these establishments), and thus "the dog wanted to see what was 'going on behind closed doors'". Nett suggests that the punchline could be a pun that is incomprehensible to modern readers, or a reference to some figure who was well known at the time but similarly unfamiliar to us today. Gonzalo Rubio, another Assyriologist, cautions that this ambiguity ultimately means it is simply not possible to definitely categorize the proverb as a joke, though he and other scholars like Nett do point to the recurring use of innuendo in such proverbs as indicating that many were indeed intended to be humorous.

Variants 
Variations on the bar joke include puns or wordplay (e.g., "A panda walks into a bar; it eats, shoots and leaves"), or inanimate objects (e.g. "a sandwich walks into a bar, orders a beer, and is told by the bartender, we don't serve food here"). 

Another variant involves several men walking into the bar together, often with related professions, such as a priest, a minister and a rabbi. In effect, this is a merger between the "bar joke" and trio jokes involving priests, ministers and rabbis (or Buddhist monks, etc.) in other settings. This form has become so well known that it is the subject of at least one joke about the popularity of the joke itself: "A priest, a minister, and a rabbi walk into a bar. The bartender looks at them and says, 'What is this, a joke?'".

According to Scott McNeely in the Ultimate Book of Jokes, the first bar joke was published in 1952 in The New York Times.

See also
 Bellman joke

References 

Joke cycles